Selo Sveti Marko is a village located 3 km north-west from Perušić in Lika-Senj County, Croatia. The 2011 population was 34.

References

Populated places in Lika-Senj County